Kerrith Whyte Jr. (born October 31, 1996) is an American football running back for the Memphis Showboats of the United States Football League (USFL). He played college football at Florida Atlantic, and was selected by the Chicago Bears in the seventh round of the 2019 NFL Draft. He has also played for the Pittsburgh Steelers, Buffalo Bills, Jacksonville Jaguars, and the Green Bay Packers

College career
Whyte attended Florida Atlantic, where he spent his career behind starting back Devin Singletary. In 2018, Whyte recorded a career-high 134 carries for 866 yards and eight touchdowns, along with 19 kickoff returns for an average of 28.7 yards and a touchdown.

He ended his FAU career with 232 total carries for 1,358 and 11 touchdowns, 22 receptions for 327 yards and two touchdowns, and an 81 kickoff return  for 26.1 average yards and two scores.

Professional career

Before the 2019 NFL Draft, Whyte participated at FAU's Pro Day, where he recorded a 40-yard dash time of 4.36 seconds; the time would have been the second fastest at the NFL Scouting Combine.

Chicago Bears
In the seventh round, the Chicago Bears drafted Whyte with the 222nd-overall pick. Bears running back coach Charles London had conducted a private workout with Whyte at FAU prior to the draft. He signed his four-year rookie contract on May 13. He was waived on September 26 and re-signed to the practice squad the next day.

Pittsburgh Steelers
On November 16, 2019, Whyte was signed by the Pittsburgh Steelers off the Bears' practice squad. Due to injuries to the Steelers' top running backs, on December 8, 2019, Whyte accounted for 74 total yards in a win against the Arizona Cardinals. In the 2019 season, Whyte totaled 24 carries for 122 rushing yards in six games.

On September 5, 2020, Whyte was waived by the Steelers.

Detroit Lions
On September 9, 2020, Whyte was signed to the Detroit Lions' practice squad. He was placed on the practice squad/injured list on October 6.

Buffalo Bills
On August 24, 2021, Whyte signed a one-year deal with the Buffalo Bills. He was waived six days later.

Jacksonville Jaguars
On October 12, 2021, Whyte was signed to the Jacksonville Jaguars' practice squad. The Jaguars released him on November 8.

Green Bay Packers
The Green Bay Packers signed Whyte to their practice squad on November 16, 2021. He was released on November 25.

Denver Broncos
On November 30, 2021, Whyte was signed to the Denver Broncos practice squad. He was released on December 21.

Green Bay Packers (second stint)
On December 29, 2021, Whyte was again signed to the Green Bay Packers practice squad.

Tampa Bay Bandits
Whyte signed with the Tampa Bay Bandits of the USFL on November 3, 2022.

Memphis Showboats
White and all other Tampa Bay Bandits players were all transferred to the Memphis Showboats after it was announced that the Bandits were taking a hiatus and that the Showboats were joining the league.

References

External links
Pittsburgh Steelers bio
FAU Owls bio

1996 births
Living people
People from Loxahatchee, Florida
Players of American football from Florida
Sportspeople from the Miami metropolitan area
American football running backs
Florida Atlantic Owls football players
Chicago Bears players
Pittsburgh Steelers players
Detroit Lions players
Buffalo Bills players
Jacksonville Jaguars players
Green Bay Packers players
Denver Broncos players
Tampa Bay Bandits (2022) players